François-Xavier Cloutier (2 November 1848 – 18 September 1934) was a Canadian Roman Catholic Bishop. He was Bishop of Trois Rivières from 1889 to his death in 1934.

References
 Catholic-Hierarchy entry

External links
 

1848 births
1934 deaths
20th-century Roman Catholic bishops in Canada
19th-century Roman Catholic bishops in Canada
Roman Catholic bishops of Trois-Rivières